The Hundred Flowers Award for Best Supporting Actress was first awarded by the China Film Association in 1962.

1980–2004

Since 2006

Records

References

Supporting Actress
Film awards for supporting actress